Forpost Starovatazhensky is a rural locality (a selo) in Tishkovsky Selsoviet of Volodarsky District, Astrakhan Oblast, Russia. The population was 281 as of 2010. There is 1 street.

Geography 
Forpost Starovatazhensky is located 109 km south of Volodarsky (the district's administrative centre) by road. Tishkovo is the nearest rural locality.

References 

Rural localities in Volodarsky District, Astrakhan Oblast